Krasnye Kholmy is a rural locality (a settlement) in Ivanovskoye Rural Settlement, Paninsky District, Voronezh Oblast, Russia. The population was 231 as of 2010. There are 4 streets.

Geography 
Krasnye Kholmy is located on the Pravaya Khava River, 19 km west of Panino (the district's administrative centre) by road. Ivanovka 1-ya is the nearest rural locality.

References 

Rural localities in Paninsky District